The Tromsø Trailblazers are an American football team based in Tromsø, Norway. They are currently members of the Norway American Football Federation (NoAFF).

American football teams in Norway